Entandrophragma cylindricum is a tree of the genus Entandrophragma of the family Meliaceae. It is commonly known as sapele or sapelli or sapele mahogany, as well as aboudikro, assi, and muyovu.

Origin of the name

The name sapele comes from that of the city of Sapele in Nigeria, where there is a preponderance of the tree. African Timber and Plywood (AT&P), a division of the United Africa Company, had a factory at this location where the wood, along with Triplochiton scleroxylon, Obeche, mahogany, and Khaya was processed into timber which was then exported from the Port of Sapele worldwide.
 
The name of the city itself is said to be an anglicisation of the Urhobo word Uriapele, commemorating a local deity. It is believed the British colonial authorities changed the name of the then hamlet to Sapele as it was easier to pronounce.

Description
Entandrophragma cylindricum is native to tropical Africa. There are protected populations and felling restrictions in place in various countries.

The species grows to a height of up to 45 m (rarely 60 m). The leaves are deciduous in the dry season, alternately arranged, pinnate, with 5-9 pairs of leaflets, each leaflet about 10 cm long. The flowers are produced in loose inflorescences when the tree is leafless, each flower about 5 mm diameter, with five yellowish petals. The fruit is a pendulous capsule about 10 cm long and 4 cm broad; when mature it splits into five sections to release the 15-20 seeds.

Uses

This commercially important hardwood is reminiscent of mahogany, and is a part of the same Meliaceae family. It is darker in tone and has a distinctive figure, typically applied where figure is important. Sapele is particularly prized for a lustrous iridescence with colors that range from light pink to brown and gold to red. It has a high density of 640 kg/m and interlocked grain, which can make machining somewhat difficult. Demand for sapele increased as a mahogany substitute in recent years due to genuine mahogany becoming a CITES Appendix II listed species. It is used in the manufacture of furniture, joinery, veneers, luxury flooring, musical instruments, and boat building.

Among its more exotic uses is in musical instruments. It is used for the back and sides (and sometimes top) of acoustic guitar bodies, as well as the bodies of electric guitars. It is also used in manufacturing the neck piece of ukuleles and 26- and 36-string harps. In the late 1990s, it started to be used as a board for Basque percussion instruments txalaparta.

References

External links

Entandrophragma
Trees of Africa
Vulnerable plants
Wood
Woodworking